Treasure Venture (侠女闯天关) is a comedy TV series which was produced in mainland China and Taiwan in 2000. It starred Zhao Wei and Nicky Wu.

Cast
Zhao Wei starred as Lu Jianping and Du Huixin
Nicky Wu starred as Shui Ruoyan
Lin Jianhuan starred as Prince Zhu Yulong
Ku Pao-ming starred as Wu Ma
Lin Fangbing - Ye Yinniang
Liu Zi - Bai Ruixue
 - Cao Youxiang
Cao Jun - Xiao Long
Hao Shaowen - Xiao Fu
Niu Ben - Bai
Li Baoan - Lu Dingwen

International broadcast

External links

Mandarin-language television shows
Chinese comedy-drama television series
2000 Chinese television series debuts
2000 Chinese television series endings